There's Hope is the first studio album by guitarist Marco Sfogli, released on February 15, 2008 through Lion Music.

Track listing

Personnel
Marco Sfogli – guitar, keyboard (tracks 1–3, 7), bass (tracks 5–7, 11), mixing, production
Matt Guillory – keyboard solo (tracks 1, 7)
Emanuele Casali – keyboard solo (track 2)
Alex Argento – keyboard (track 8), keyboard solos (tracks 3, 5, 8)
Fabio Tommasone – piano
Salvyo Maiello – drums (tracks 1, 2, 7–9)
John Macaluso – drums (tracks 3, 4)
Ennio Giannone – drums (tracks 5, 6)
Raffaele Natale – drums (track 11)
Andrea Casali – bass (tracks 1, 2, 4, 8, 9)
Dino Fiorenza – bass (track 3)
Enzo Foniciello – engineering
Marco Riccardo Musco – engineering
Richard Chycki – mixing
Enzo Rizzo – mastering

References

2008 debut albums
Lion Music albums
Albums recorded in a home studio